Samantha Ferrari (born 25 September 1973 in Muggiò near Milan) is a retired Italian rhythmic gymnast.

She competed for Italy in the rhythmic gymnastics all-around competition at the 1992 Summer Olympics in Barcelona. She was 11th in the qualification and advanced to the final, placing 12th overall.

References

External links 
 

1973 births
Living people
Italian rhythmic gymnasts
Gymnasts at the 1992 Summer Olympics
Olympic gymnasts of Italy
Gymnasts from Rome